Jorge Catalino Guasch Bazán (born 17 January 1961, in Itá, Paraguay) is a former football midfielder.

Nicknamed "El Chino" (the Chinese), Guasch started his career at the small regional club Guaraní de Davaru in the city of Carapeguá, in 1975. Scouts from Club Olimpia noticed his talent and one year later, in 1976, he was playing in the Paraguayan first division. Guasch became Olimpia's captain in 1988 and he remained with the club until his retirement in 1991, winning several national and international championships. He is regarded as one of the club's most important players.

International 
Guasch made his international debut for the Paraguay national football team on 3 February 1985, in a friendly match against Uruguay (1–0 loss). He obtained a total number of 47 international caps, scoring no goals for the national side. Guasch was part of the Paraguay squad at the 1986 World Cup and also competed in several Copa América tournament editions.

Honours

Club
 Olimpia
 Paraguayan Primera División: 1978, 1979, 1980, 1981, 1982, 1983, 1985, 1988, 1989
 Copa Libertadores: 1979, 1990
Copa Interamericana: 1979
Intercontinental Cup: 1979
Supercopa Sudamericana: 1990
Recopa Sudamericana: 1990

References

External links
Jorge Guasch: Un ‘‘6’’ estupendo y líder dentro del campo de juego 
rsssf

1961 births
Living people
People from Itá, Paraguay
Paraguay international footballers
1986 FIFA World Cup players
Paraguayan footballers
Club Olimpia footballers
Paraguayan Primera División players
1987 Copa América players
1989 Copa América players
Association football midfielders